Nikonion and Nikonia was an ancient Greek city on the east bank of the Dniester estuary. Its ruins are located 300 meters to the northwest of the modern village Roksolany, in the Ovidiopol district of the Odesa Oblast, Ukraine.

History
Niconium was founded in the second half of the 6th century BC by colonists from Miletus. On the opposite bank of the river other Milesian colonists had already founded Tyras. The city was founded at a time when many nomadic tribes were beginning to settle in the areas north of the Black Sea. The Greeks settled in this area because of the plentiful fishing and the opportunity to trade with these barbarian settlers.

Stone construction in the city began in the 5th century. At the turn of the 3rd-2nd centuries BC, the city was destroyed, an event which was associated with the Macedonian commander Zopyrion, associate of Alexander the Great. In the 1st century BC, the size of the city increased from the previous period. Niconium was abandoned permanently in the middle of the third century AD when the area was invaded by the Goths during the Great Migrations.

Archaeological excavations
The city was located on a plateau which now descends steeply into the Dniestr estuary, which has submerged the lower terrace of the city. The size of the city is estimated to be .

According to the findings of excavations in the area, it appears that in the 5th-4th centuries BC, the money in Niconium mostly consisted of Histrian coins. It is also possible that Niconium itself minted coins, because some of the coins discovered during excavation are unique in appearance and bear the name of the Scythian king Scyles, who had established a protectorate over Niconium and other settlements in the area and may have been buried in the city.

References

Further reading

А.Г Загинайло П. О. Карышковский. Монеты cкифского царя Скила [Coins of Scythian King Scylus] // Нумизматические исследования по истории Юго-Восточной Европы: Сборник научых трудов. –  Кишинёв: Штиинца, 1990. – С. 3 – 15
Загинайло А.Г. Литые монеты царя Скила. // Древнее Причерноморье. – Одесса, 1990. – С. 64-71.

External links

Description of excavations in Niconium by the Nicolaus Copernicus University in 2012, including pictures
Одесский музей нумизматики. Никоний
Odesa State Museum of Archaeology

Milesian Pontic colonies
Ancient history of Ukraine
Former populated places in Eastern Europe
Greek colonies on the Black Sea coast